Eastern Command may refer to:
Eastern Command (Australia)
Eastern Command (India)
Eastern Command (Pakistan)
Eastern Command (United Kingdom)
Eastern Command of the Imperial Army (Japan)
Jordanian Eastern Command

See also
Eastern Air Command (disambiguation)
Eastern Naval Command (India)
Eastern Flying Training Command (United States)
Eastern Defense Command (United States)
Eastern Military Command (Brazil)